Pseudo-Geber  (or "Latin pseudo-Geber") is the presumed author or group of authors responsible for a corpus of pseudepigraphic alchemical writings dating to the late 13th and early 14th centuries. These writings were falsely attributed to Jabir ibn Hayyan (died 816, latinized as Geber), an early alchemist of the Islamic Golden Age.

Its actual author has been tentatively identified as Paul of Taranto. The work was influential in the domain of alchemy and metallurgy in late medieval Europe. The work contains experimental demonstrations of the corpuscular nature of matter that were still being used by seventeenth-century chemists such as Daniel Sennert, who in turn influenced Robert Boyle. The work is among the first to describe nitric acid, aqua regia, and aqua fortis.

The existence of Jabir ibn Hayyan as a historical figure is itself in question, and most of the numerous Arabic works attributed to him are, themselves, pseudepigrapha dating to c. 850–950. The "pseudo-Geber problem" is the question of a possible relation between the two corpora. This question has long been controversially discussed. It is now mostly thought that at least parts of the Latin pseudo-Geber works are based on earlier Islamic authors such as Abu Bakr al-Razi (c. 865–925).

Corpus
The following set of books is called the "pseudo-Geber Corpus" (or the "Latin Geber Corpus"). 
The works were first edited in the 16th century, but had been in circulation in manuscript form for roughly 200 years beforehand. 
The stated author is Geber or Geber Arabs (Geber the Arab), and it is stated in some copies that the translator is Rodogerus Hispalensis (Roger of Hispania).
The works attributed to Geber include:
 ("The Height of the Perfection of Mastery").
 ("Book of Furnaces"),
 ("On the Investigation of Perfection"), and
 ("On the Discovery of Truth").

Being the clearest expression of alchemical theory and laboratory directions available until then—in a field where mysticism, secrecy, and obscurity were the usual rule—pseudo-Geber's books were widely read and influential among European alchemists.

The  in particular was one of the most widely read alchemy books in western Europe in the late medieval period. 
Its author assumed that all metals are composed of unified sulfur and mercury corpuscles and gave detailed descriptions of metallic properties in those terms. 
The use of an elixir for transmuting base metals into gold is explained (see philosopher's stone) and a lengthy defense is given defending alchemy against the charge that transmutation of metals was impossible.

The practical directions for laboratory procedures were so clear that it is obvious the author was familiar with many chemical operations. It contains early recipes for producing mineral acids. It was not equaled in chemistry until the 16th century writings of chemist Vannoccio Biringuccio, mineralogist Georgius Agricola and assayer Lazarus Ercker.

Their author is not the same as the others, but it is not certain that the first four have the same author either.
 has the earliest known recipe for the preparation of nitric acid.

Manuscripts:
 , Biblioteca Marciana, Venice, MS. Latin VI.215  [3519].
, Glasgow University Library, Ferguson MS. 232.
, British Library, MS Slane 1068

Early editions:
 1525: Faustus Sabaeus,  Marcellus Silber, Rome.
1528, 1529: , Strasbourg
1531:  Johann Grüninger, Strasbourg.
1541: Peter Schoeffer the Younger,  (hathitrust.org)
1545: , Nuremberg
1572: , Basel
1598: , Strasbourg.
1668: Georgius Hornius, Leiden
1682: , Gdansk

Early translations:
1530 Das Buch Geberi von der Verborgenheyt der Alchymia, Strasbourg
1551: Giovanni Bracesco, Esposizione di Geber filosofo, Gabriele Giolito de' Ferrari e fratelli, Venice
1678: The Works Of Geber, Latin-to-English translation by Richard Russell. Book delivers most of the Pseudo-Geber corpus in English. It was reprinted in 1686.
1692: William Salmon, The Sum of GEBER ARABS, Collected and Digested: At EEBO in two parts: Part 1 and Part 2
1710: Geberi curieuse vollständige Chymische Schriften, Frankfurt

Authorship
Islamic alchemy was held in high esteem by 13th century European alchemists, and the author adopted the name of an illustrious predecessor, as was usual practice at the time. 
The authorship of Geber (Jabir ibn Hayyan) was first questioned in the late 19th century by  the studies of Kopp, Hoefer, Berthelot, and Lippmann. The corpus is clearly influenced by medieval Islamic writers (especially by Abu Bakr al-Razi, and to a lesser extent, the eponymous Jabir). 
The identity of the author remains uncertain. 
He may have lived in Italy or Spain, or both. Crosland (1962) refers to Geber as "a Latin author" while still emphasizing the identity of the author being "still in dispute".
  
William R. Newman has argued that the author of the  may have been Paul of Taranto, a tentative identification which is often accepted as likely.

For example, there is no mention in the 13th century writings of Albertus Magnus and Roger Bacon.

The degree of dependence of the corpus from actual Islamic sources is somewhat disputed:
Brown (1920) asserted that the pseudo-Geber Corpus contained "new and original facts" not known from Islamic alchemy, specifically mention of 
nitric acid, oil of vitriol and silver nitrate. Already in the 1920s, Eric John Holmyard criticized the claim of pseudo-Geber being "new and original" compared to medieval Islamic alchemy, arguing for direct derivation from Islamic authors. 
Holmyard later argued that the then-recent discovery of Jabir's The Book of Seventy diminished the weight of the argument of there being "no Arabic originals" corresponding to pseudo-Geber, 
By 1957, Holmyard was willing to admit that "the general style of the works is too clear and systematic to find a close parallel in any of the known writings of the Jabirian corpus" and that they seemed to be "the product of an occidental rather than an oriental mind" while still asserting that the author must have been able to read Arabic and most likely worked in Moorish Spain.

By contrast, Ahmad Y. Al-Hassan (2005) claimed that Islamic texts dated to before the 13th century, including the works of Jabir and Abu Bakr al-Razi, did in fact contain detailed descriptions of substances such as nitric acid, vitriol, and various nitrates,
and Al-Hassan in 2009 argued that the pseudo-Gerber Corpus was a direct translation of a work originally written in Arabic, pointing to a number of Arabic Jabirian manuscripts which already contain much of the theories and practices that Berthelot previously attributed to the Latin corpus.

References

Works cited
  (the same content and more is also available online; a paper with a slightly different title, "The Arabic origin of the Summa and Geber Latin works. A refutation of Berthelot, Ruska and Newman on the basis of Arabic sources", was published in 2011 in the Journal for the History of Arabic Science, 15, pp. 3–54; a paper with the same altered title appears on the author's website)
 
 
 
 
 
 
 
 
 
 
 
 

13th-century alchemists
14th-century alchemists
Pseudepigraphy
13th-century scientists